The 2022 Cambodian League 2 is the 5th season of the Cambodian League 2, second-tier football league for association football clubs in Cambodia. A total of 12 football clubs are competing in the league. Electricite du Cambodge are the champion of the 2022 season and are promoted to Cambodian Premier League next season alongside ISI Dangkor Senchey.

Teams

Team changes

Team locations

Personnel and kits

Foreign players

The number of foreign players is restricted to 4 per team. A team can use 3 foreign players on the field in each game, including at least 1 player from the AFC region.

Players name in bold indicates the player is registered during the mid-season transfer window.

League table

Top scorers

As of 30 October 2022.

Source: Top Scorers in week 22

See also
2022 Cambodian Premier League
2022 Hun Sen Cup

References 

Football competitions in Cambodia